Nathan Bryan (1748 – June 4, 1798) was a two-term U.S. Congressman from North Carolina, serving from 1795 to 1798 when he died in office. He had previously been a Revolutionary War leader.

Early life
Bryan was born in Craven County, North Carolina (present-day Jones County) in 1748.

Political career
He was a member of the North Carolina House of Commons in 1787 and from 1791 to 1794. In 1794, Bryan, a Republican, was elected to the 4th United States Congress and re-elected to the 5th U.S. Congress; he died in office on June 4, 1798 in Philadelphia, where he is buried.

Nathan served as a delegate from Craven County in the 1788 Hillsborough Convention that met to debate the United States Constitution.

See also
 List of United States Congress members who died in office (1790–1899)

References

1748 births
1798 deaths
Members of the North Carolina House of Representatives
People from Jones County, North Carolina
Democratic-Republican Party members of the United States House of Representatives from North Carolina
18th-century American politicians